Fuentes (meaning "fountains" or "sources" in Spanish) may refer to:

People
 Fuentes (surname)

Places
 Fort Fuentes, a military fort near Colico, province of Lecco, Lombardy, Italy
Fuentes (Cuenca), a municipality in the province of Cuenca, Castile-La Mancha, Spain
 Fuentes Calientes, a municipality in the province of Teruel, Aragón, Spain
Fuentes Carrionas, a mountain range belonging to Cantabrian Mountains in Northern Spain
 Fuentes Claras, a municipality in the province of Teruel, Aragón, Spain
Fuentes de Andalucía, a municipality in the province of Seville, Andalusia, Spain
Fuentes de Año, a municipality in the province of Ávila, Castile and León, Spain
Fuentes de Ayódar, a municipality in the province of Castellón, Valencian Community, Spain
 Fuentes de Béjar, a municipality in the province of Salamanca, Castile and León, Spain
Fuentes de Carbajal, a municipality in the province of León, Castile and León, Spain
Fuentes de Corbeiro, a parish in Cangas del Narcea, a municipality in the province and autonomous community of Asturias, Spain
Fuentes de Ebro, a municipality in the province of Zaragoza, Aragón, Spain
Fuentes de Jiloca, a municipality in the province of Zaragoza, Aragon, Spain
Fuentes de León, a municipality in the province of Badajoz, Extremadura, Spain
Fuentes de Magaña, is a municipality located in the province of Soria, Castile and León, Spain
Fuentes del Narcea, Degaña and Ibias Natural Park, a natural park in the province and autonomous community of Asturias, Spain
Fuentes de Nava, a municipality in the province of Palencia, Castile and León, Spain
 Fuentes de Oñoro, a village and municipality in the province of Salamanca, Spain
 Battle of Fuentes de Oñoro, fought 1811 between British-Portuguese and French forces
 Fuentes de Ropel, a municipality in the province of Zamora, Castile and León, Spain
Fuentes de Rubielos, a municipality in the province of Teruel, Aragón
Fuentes de Valdepero, a municipality in the province of Palencia, Castile and León, Spain
 Fuentes del Valle, a town in the State of Mexico, Mexico

Other uses
 Discos Fuentes, a record label based in Medellín, Colombia
Fuentes (spider), a genus of the spider family Salticidae, jumping spiders